"On My Knees" is a 1996 song performed by Jaci Velasquez. It is considered Velasquez's signature song and was released as the third single from her debut album Heavenly Place. A Spanish version was released on the album Llegar A Ti in 1999.

Composition
"On My Knees" is originally in the key of A Major, with a tempo of 93 beats per minute. Written in common time, Velasquez's vocal range spans from G#3 to E5 during the song.

Commercial performance
The song was a Christian radio success, peaking at No. 1 on both the R&R Christian AC and Christian Inspo National Airplay charts, upon its release. On October 6, 2012 "On My Knees" peaked at No. 50 on the Billboard Christian Digital Songs.

Music video
The music video for the song premiered on YouTube on October 26, 2009. It shows Velasquez walking around while singing. However, since 2019 it has been removed from YouTube. During its time on the platform, the video gathered over two million views.

Live performances
Velasquez performed the song on the GMA Dove Awards. She also performed the song on the 2015 release, CCM United: We Will Stand.

Cover versions
Nicole C. Mullen covered the song on her eponymous album in 2000. Ally Brooke covered the song in 2012 as her audition on the X Factor USA. She received universal acclaim from the judges for her performance.

Accolades

Charts

References 

1996 singles
1996 songs
Jaci Velasquez songs